The WNBA draft is the league's annual process for determining which Women's National Basketball Association teams receive the rights to negotiate with players entering the league. The 2008 draft was held on April 9.

A lottery was held on October 23, 2007. The Los Angeles Sparks received the first overall selection of the upcoming 2008 draft. The Chicago Sky received the number two selection. The Minnesota Lynx came up with the third overall selection, followed by the Atlanta Dream expansion franchise at four, the Houston Comets at number five, and the Washington Mystics at number six. Some of the top draftees were Candace Parker, Sylvia Fowles, Candice Wiggins, Crystal Langhorne, and Tasha Humphrey.

Top pick Candace Parker went on to become the first WNBA player to be the league's Rookie of the Year and MVP in the same season. Fourth pick Alexis Hornbuckle became the first person to win a national championship in college (with the University of Tennessee) and a WNBA title (with the Detroit Shock) in the same calendar year.

Transactions 
The Detroit Shock holds the eleventh pick in round one as part of the Katie Feenstra/Ruth Riley trade back in February 2007.

The San Antonio Silver Stars holds the twenty-first pick as part of 2007 WNBA draft trade with the New York Liberty that involved Becky Hammon.

On February 6, 2008 the Atlanta Dream traded the number four pick to the Seattle Storm along with Roneeka Hodges for the eighth pick and Iziane Castro Marques.
On February 6, 2008 the Atlanta Dream traded the eighteenth pick and LaToya Thomas to the Detroit Shock for Ivory Latta.
On February 19, 2008 the Seattle Storm traded the fourth pick to the Detroit Shock for Swin Cash.
On February 19, 2008 the Connecticut Sun acquired the Indiana Fever's twelfth overall pick in the Tamika Whitmore/Katie Douglas trade.

Key

Expansion Draft

College draft

Round 1

Round 2

Round 3

References

External links
Results of the 2008 WNBA draft lottery
Results of Expansion Draft
WNBA 2008 Draft Order
Date of The 2008 WNBA Draft

Draft
Women's National Basketball Association Draft